Tassawar Khanum (born 1950) is a Pakistani Ghazal and playback film singer. She is mostly known for singing in Urdu and Punjabi in Pakistani films and television during the 1970s and 1980s.

Early life and career
Tassawar Khanum was born in Gujrat, Pakistan. During her childhood she was a neighbor of singer Pervaiz Mehdi who was a good friend of her father. She and her father would often go Pervaiz Mehdi's house while he was practicing. It was the fellow singer Pervaiz Mehdi who asked her father to ensure that Tassawar should receive an education in music after he overheard her copying him while he practiced. After this, she began to take music lessons with sarangi nawaz Ustad Butta Ali Khan.

Tassawar Khanum first appeared on Pakistan Television (PTV). She was popular in the 1970s and 1980s when she sang many super-hit film songs including this mega-hit film song from film Rangeela (1970), "Wey Sab Taun Sohneya, Hai Wey Mann Mohnya.

Filmography

Popular songs
 Wey Sab Taun Sohneya, Hai Wey Mann Mohnya Main Kehyea, Gall Sun Ja.. (film Yaar Badshah - 1971)
 Mera Dilbar, Mera Dildar Tun En.. (film Jagday Rehna - 1972)
 Es Jagg Di Jaddun Tak Kahani Raway.. (film Ik Pyar Tay 2 Parchhawen - 1972)
 Agar Tum Milj Jao, Zamana Chhor Den Gay Ham.. (film Imandar - 1974)
 Tu Meri Zindagi Hay, Tu Meri Har Khushi Hay''.. (film Mohabbat Mar Nahin Sakti - 1977)

Personal life
Tassawar Khanum was married to Rais Ghulam Ali Khan Marri in 1973 until his death in 1988.  She has a son and two daughters and several grandchildren. She got married right after she recorded her song in film Rangeela (1970) which became highly popular later.

Awards and recognition
Pride of Performance Award by the President of Pakistan in 2006.

References

External links
Tassawar Khanum on IMDb website

1950 births
Living people
Pakistani women singers
Pakistani ghazal singers
Pakistani playback singers
Punjabi people
Singers from Lahore
Recipients of the Pride of Performance
Women ghazal singers